Kwame Kizito (born 21 July 1996) is a Ghanaian footballer who plays as forward for Allsvenskan side Falkenbergs FF.

Early career
Kwame started his career with Ghanaian youth side, Golden Tulip FC. After an impressive season with the academy, he moved to FC Kolon Academy where he was scouted by Glow Lamps Academy. Playing Professional Football was something Kwame always dream about. In 2013, Golden Lions Soccer Academy Team A signed the Ghanaian youngster where he spend one season before getting the attraction of Ghana Premier League club Accra Hearts of Oak Sporting Club.

Personal
Kwame was born at Anomabo, a town located in the Central Region of Ghana. He was born unto to union of Mr. and Mrs. Kizito (both parents are all Ghanaian citizens.

Career statistics

Kwame played the following matches and scored the number of goals listed below:

Personal Achievement
2014, Highest Goal Scorer Award, Glow Lamp Soccer Academy, Ghana

Club Achievement
2015, President Cup Winner, Accra Hearts of Oak Sporting Club, Ghana

References 

 kapital971.com
 qatar-soccer.net
 livesoccertv.com
 footballgh.com
ghana-news.adomonline.com
 modernghana.com
goal.com
metafootball.com

External links
 
 
 ghplstats.com

1996 births
Living people
Association football forwards
Ghanaian footballers
Ghanaian expatriate footballers
Ghana international footballers
Accra Hearts of Oak S.C. players
Al-Ittihad Club (Tripoli) players
BK Häcken players
Falkenbergs FF players
Allsvenskan players
Ghanaian expatriate sportspeople in Libya
Ghanaian expatriate sportspeople in Sweden
Expatriate footballers in Libya
Expatriate footballers in Sweden
Libyan Premier League players